Émile Magne (29 July 1877 – 28 March 1953) was a French writer, critic, historian of literature and art.

Biography 
Born in Dax, Émile Magne attended the lycée of Bordeaux, then was a student at the Sorbonne. In 1898 he published a first study of documentation errors in the Cyrano de Bergerac by Edmond Rostand. He specialized in the history, mainly literary history, of the French 17th century.

A collaborator of the Mercure de France, he also published works on heritage and art.

Émile Male died in Saint-Maur-des-Fossés aged 75.

Main publications 
 Les Erreurs de documentation de Cyrano de Bergerac, Paris, Revue de France, 1898.
 Le Cyrano de l'Histoire, Paris, Dujarric, 1903.
 Bertran de Born, Paris, Lechevalier, 1904.
 Scarron et son milieu, Paris, Mercure de France, 1905.
 Madame de Villedieu, Mercure de France, 1907.
 Madame de La Suze et la Société précieuse, Mercure de France, 1908.
 L'Esthétique des villes, Mercure de France, 1908.
 Le Plaisant Abbé de Boisrobert, fondateur de l'Académie française, Paris, 1909.
 Madame de Châtillon, Mercure de France, 1910.
 Voiture et les Origines de l'hôtel de Rambouillet, Mercure de France, 1911.
 Gaultier-Garguille, comédien de l'hôtel de Bourgogne, Paris, Louis-Michaud, 1911.
 Voiture et les Années de gloire de l'hôtel de Rambouillet, Mercure de France, 1912.
 Les Femmes illustres : Ninon de Lenclos, Paris, Nilson, 1912.
 Nicolas Poussin, premier peintre du roi, Brussel, Van Oest, 1914.
 Jean de La Bruyère (1645-1696), Paris, Plon-Nourrit, 1914.
 Lettres inédites du Grand Condé et du duc d'Enghien à Marie-Louise de Gonzague, reine de Pologne, sur la cour de Louis XIV, Paris, Émile Paul, 1920.
 Une amie inconnue de Molière, Paris, Émile Paul, 1922.
 Le Vrai Visage de La Rochefoucauld, Paris, Ollendorff, 1923.
 Madame de La Fayette en ménage, 1926.
 Le Cœur et l'Esprit de Madame de La Fayette, Émile Paul, 1927
 Le Salon de Madeleine de Scudéry, ou le Royaume de Tendre, Monaco, Imprimerie de Monaco, 1927.
 Bibliographie générale des œuvres de Nicolas Boileau-Despréaux et de Gilles et Jacques, Paris, L. Giraud-Badin, 1929.
 Boileau. Documents inédits, L. Giraud-Badin, 1929.
 Les Plaisirs et les Fêtes. Les fêtes en Europe au XVIIe siècle, Paris, Rombaldi, 1930.
 Le Château de Saint-Cloud, Paris, Calmann-Lévy, 1932.
 Le Château de Marly, Calmann-Lévy, illustrations by [[Charles Émile Egli[Carlègle]] (album for children), Calmann-Lévy, 1935.
 Naissance de l'Académie française, Paris, L'Illustration, 1935.
 Images de Paris sous Louis XIV. Documents inédits, Calmann-Lévy, 1939.
 La Vie quotidienne au temps de Louis XIV, Paris, Hachette, 1942.

Distinctions 
 Croix de guerre 1914-1918
 Chevalier of the Légion d'honneur (1920), officer (1927), then commandeur (1949)
 Laureate of the Académie française and the Société des gens de lettres

References

External links 
 Magne, Émile on INHA 
 Yves-Marie Bercé, Le fonds Émile-Magne de la bibliothèque municipale de Saint-Maur-des-Fossés 
 Bourgeois et financiers du XVIIe siècle. La joyeuse jeunesse de Tallemant des Réaux, d'après des documents inédits on Persée 
 Émile Magne on IdRef 

19th-century French writers
20th-century French writers
French literary critics
French art historians
Winners of the Prix Broquette-Gonin (literature)
1877 births
People from Dax, Landes
1953 deaths
Commandeurs of the Légion d'honneur
Recipients of the Croix de Guerre 1914–1918 (France)
20th-century French male writers
French male non-fiction writers